Ruth Peggy Sophie Parnass (born 11 October 1927) is a German-Swedish actress, columnist, court reporter, short story writer and non-fiction writer who now lives in Hamburg.

Biography
Born in Hamburg in 1927, she was the daughter of Herta Emanuel, who was half Portuguese, and Simon, a Polish Jew. Both were sent by the Nazis to the Treblinka extermination camp where they died in 1942. Parnass tells the story of her childhood in Unter die Haut (1983) and in Kindheit (2014), illustrated by Tita do Rêgo Silva. She and her little brother Gady had been sent to Sweden in 1939. Separated from her brother, she lived in 12 different families until, towards the end of the Second World War, she was sent to London to stay with an uncle, the only surviving member of the family. After spending three years there, she returned to Stockholm, completing her studies in Hamburg and Paris. Her brother went to Israel.

Although she had vowed never to live in Germany again, after returning to Hamburg to visit her cousin, she met many interesting left-wing antifascists and decided to stay. For 17 years, she worked for the magazine Konkret, where she reported on the proceedings of the Berlin law courts. Her work forms the basis of her widely acclaimed Prozesse (Trials), published in 1978, for which she received the Joseph Drexel Prize in 1979 for outstanding achievements in journalism.

Awards
Peggy Parnass has received several awards including:
1980: Fritz Bauer Prize
1998: Biermann-Ratjen-Medaille
2008: Order of Merit of the Federal Republic of Germany

Selected publications
 Prozesse 1970–1978; Reinbek bei Hamburg: Rowohlt, 1992;  (=Hamburg: Rasch und Röhring, 1990; ; 1. Auflage: Frankfurt am Main: Zweitausendeins, 1978)
 Interview mit Marie Marcks; in: Marie Marcks: Schöne Aussichten; Berlin: Elefantenpress, 1980; 
 Unter die Haut; Hamburg: Konkret-Literatur-Verlag, 1983; 
 Kleine radikale Minderheit; Hamburg: Konkret Literatur Verlag, 1985; 
 Süchtig nach Leben; Hamburg: Konkret Literatur Verlag, 1990;  (Autobiographie)
 Mut und Leidenschaft; Hamburg: Konkret Literatur Verlag, 1993; 
 Vor- und Nachwort in: Flora Neumann: Erinnern, um zu leben. Vor Auschwitz, in Auschwitz, nach Auschwitz; Hamburg: Konkret Literatur Verlag, 20063; 
 Kindheit; Hamburg: Verlag Schwarze Kunst, 2012;  (with lithographs by Tita do Rêgo Silva)

Films
Peggy Parnass has appeared in several films and television programmes including:
1965: Zwei
1985: King Kongs Faust
1995:

References

1927 births
Living people
Actresses from Hamburg
German women writers
Swedish women writers
Jewish emigrants from Nazi Germany to the United Kingdom
Recipients of the Cross of the Order of Merit of the Federal Republic of Germany
20th-century German women